Fernando Godoy (born 1 May 1990) is an Argentine professional footballer who as a midfielder for Huracán, on loan from Sol de América.

Career
Fernando Godoy came having graduated through the youth academy of Independiente and making his first-team debut in 2009. In 2010, he gradually began to earn a spot as a starter in the team. He ended the season with Independiente positively by winning the 2010 Copa Sudamericana, starting in six games. During the 2012 Torneo Clausura he remained continuously as a reserve under the instructions of coach Christian Díaz. On 19 May 2013, in a match against San Martín de San Juan, he scored his first goal in professional football.

From 2013 to 2015, he played as a midfielder for Panetolikos of the Super League Greece, having 63 appearances in all competitions with the club. He joined another Super League team, Atromitos, in 2015.

References

External links

1990 births
Living people
Argentine footballers
Argentine expatriate footballers
Footballers from Buenos Aires
Club Atlético Independiente footballers
Panetolikos F.C. players
Atromitos F.C. players
Godoy Cruz Antonio Tomba footballers
Talleres de Córdoba footballers
Aldosivi footballers
Curicó Unido footballers
Club Sol de América footballers
Club Atlético Huracán footballers
Argentine Primera División players
Chilean Primera División players
Super League Greece players
Association football midfielders
Argentine expatriate sportspeople in Greece
Argentine expatriate sportspeople in Chile
Argentine expatriate sportspeople in Paraguay
Expatriate footballers in Greece
Expatriate footballers in Chile
Expatriate footballers in Paraguay
Argentine sportspeople of Paraguayan descent